Syed Asif Husnain is a Pakistani politician  who is currently a member of Pak Sarzameen Party.

He had been a member of the National Assembly of Pakistan, from 2008 to May 2018.

Political career

Working for MQM 
He was elected to the National Assembly of Pakistan as a candidate of Muttahida Qaumi Movement (MQM) from Constituency NA-255 (Karachi-XVII) in 2008 Pakistani general election. He received 157,971 votes and defeated Haji Nafees Ahmed Usmani, a candidate of Pakistan Peoples Party (PPP).

He was re-elected to the National Assembly as a candidate of MQM from Constituency NA-255 (Karachi-XVII) in 2013 Pakistani general election. He received 136,982 votes and defeated Khalid Mehmood Ali, a candidate of Pakistan Tehreek-e-Insaf (PTI).

Joining PSP 
In 2016, he left MQM to join Pak Sarzameen Party and announced to resign from  National Assembly as well. In 2017, it was reported that Husnain was still holding seat at National Assembly and drawing salary, despite quitting MQM in August 2016 on whose ticket he had won the seat. Husnain was criticised by  Farooq Sattar for continuing to hold the seat of National Assembly that he had won on MQM ticket.

References

Pak Sarzameen Party members
Living people
Muhajir people
Pakistani MNAs 2013–2018
Politicians from Karachi
Pakistani MNAs 2008–2013
Year of birth missing (living people)